Central Stadium, is a multi-purpose stadium in Thiruvananthapuram, India.  It is mainly used for athletics and football. The stadium also hosts the Independence day parade of Kerala  and other government functions. The stadium hosted India's first transgender athletics meet in 2017. The stadium is also one the main venues of annual Onam festival in Thiruvananthapuram.

References

External links
 Sports Council of Kerala Website
 WikiMapia

Sports venues in Thiruvananthapuram
Year of establishment missing